Jason Hsuan is the chairman, executive director and chief executive officer of TPV Technology. Hsuan graduated from the Department of Electrical Engineering of the National Cheng Kung University, Taiwan in 1968, and holds a doctorate degree in systems engineering from the New York University Tandon School of Engineering (then Polytechnic Institute of Brooklyn) and a master's degree in systems engineering from Boston University.

In 2012, he was chairman and CEO of TPV Technology Limited.

References

Polytechnic Institute of New York University alumni
Living people
Year of birth missing (living people)
National Cheng Kung University alumni
Boston University alumni